Patrick Wilson (December 29, 1927 – September 12, 2003) was a noted librarian, information scientist and philosopher who served as a professor at the University of California, Berkeley and as dean of the School of Library and Information Studies (now the School of Information) there. Earlier in his career, Wilson taught philosophy at the University of California, Los Angeles.

Career
Wilson is noted within the library and information science communities for his work on the philosophical underpinnings of bibliographic control, that is, the ways in which knowledge is organized and the relationships between different documents and pieces of knowledge. He also did work on what he called "cognitive authority," which is the study of how people gain reputation and the authority of possessing knowledge in the eyes of other people.

He is the subject of an oral history.

Wilson was the winner of the 2001 American Society for Information Science and Technology Award of Merit. In his acceptance remarks, Wilson commented:

Published works
Wilson is the author of three books:

See also
Subject (documents)

External links
The librarian Wilson's obituary from UC Berkeley News
UC Academic Senate's memorial for Patrick Wilson

References

American librarians
1927 births
2003 deaths
University of California, Berkeley faculty
University of California, Los Angeles faculty